Walter Joseph Sullivan (March 2, 1923–August 4, 2014) was an American politician. Sullivan was the 52nd, 55th, and 62nd Mayor of Cambridge, Massachusetts.

Career
Born in Cambridge, Sullivan attended the Cambridge Rindge and Latin School, and took on work at the M.A. Sullivan Trucking Company. He served in the United States Army Air Forces during World War II.

In 1951, Sullivan served in the Massachusetts House of Representatives as a Democrat. In 1960, he served on the Cambridge City Council. Sullivan served three terms as Mayor of Cambridge from 1968-1969, 1974-1975, and 1986-1987. The City of Cambridge named their water treatment facility after him. Sullivan died in his hometown in 2014.

See also
 1951–1952 Massachusetts legislature

References

1923 births
2014 deaths
Cambridge Rindge and Latin School alumni
Military personnel from Massachusetts
United States Army Air Forces personnel of World War II
Mayors of Cambridge, Massachusetts
Massachusetts city council members
Democratic Party members of the Massachusetts House of Representatives